George Arthur Fitton (30 May 1902 – 10 September 1984) was an English footballer and cricketer. His regular position was as a forward. He was born in Melton Mowbray, Leicestershire. He played for West Bromwich Albion, Preston North End, and Manchester United.

He also played cricket for Staffordshire in the Minor Counties Championship, where as a left-handed batsman and occasional wicket-keeper, he played from 1927 to 1934, making 25 appearances.

References

External links
MUFCInfo.com profile
George Fitton at CricketArchive

1902 births
1984 deaths
English footballers
West Bromwich Albion F.C. players
Preston North End F.C. players
Manchester United F.C. players
Sportspeople from Melton Mowbray
Footballers from Leicestershire
Cricketers from Leicestershire
English cricketers
Staffordshire cricketers
Association football forwards